Mul Yam ( ‘in front of a sea’ or ‘sea mussel’) was an Israeli restaurant located in Tel Aviv Port, Tel Aviv. 

Mul Yam was established in 1995 by Shalom Maharovsky, its current owner; the chef is Yoram Nitzan. The restaurant specialized in seafood and fish, which mainly import from different parts of the world and a little meat and vegetarian dishes.

Mapa guide to Israel's best restaurants writes: "The matching between the minimalist and delicate treatment of Yoram Nitzan and the finest fish, seafood and wines that Shalom Maharovsky import, makes Mul Yam the best fish restaurant in Israel and especially the best seafood restaurant in Israel."

Gault Millau Israel awarded the restaurant its top rating for five consecutive years.

It was chosen as one of the ten best restaurants in Israel by Sagi Cohen, Maariv (newspaper) food critic. and chosen as one of the best restaurants in Israel by Daniel Rogov, Haaretz food and wine critic and as one of the ten best restaurants by Al Hashulchan magazine Mapa guide writes that: "Maybe it's the best restaurant in Israel.

On July 22, 2015, a fire caused by a short circuit in the restaurant's kitchen burned the place to the ground.

See also
 List of restaurants in Israel
 List of seafood restaurants

Gallery

In popular culture
In episode 14 of the sixth season of the American TV series The Office, "The Banker", manager Michael Scott is attempting to impress an investment banker by having Dwight Schrute pretend to be Computron, an advanced office virtual assistant. When Scott states that Cooper's Seafood has the best Maine lobster in the world, Schrute as Computron disputes this, saying Mul Yam's is better.

References

External links

 Mul Yam Site
 Restaurant description, yourway.co.il
 Niv Gilboa (April 17), Pisces: The Family of Mul Yam, Big Time magazine 
 Iris Avramovich (August 24, 2008), The Upper Carp, Ynet 
 Hanoch Bar-Shalom (June 26, 2002), The Chef and the Sea, Ynet 
 Michal Palaty (February 20, 2006), The War on the Pan, Haaretz 
 Oshrat Yekutiel (October 20, 2010), Business Menu in Mul Yam: Fish and Sea Food in International Level, City Mouse 

Restaurants in Tel Aviv
Restaurants established in 1995
Israeli restaurants
1995 establishments in Israel
Seafood restaurants
Defunct restaurants in Israel
Burned buildings and structures